The Summerland is the name given by Theosophists, Wiccans and other contemporary pagan religions to their conceptualization of an afterlife.

History of the concept
Emanuel Swedenborg (1688–1772) inspired Andrew Jackson Davis (1826–1910), in his major work The Great Harmonia, to say that Summerland is the pinnacle of human spiritual achievement in the afterlife; that is, it is the highest level, or 'sphere', of the afterlife we can hope to enter.

C.W. Leadbeater, a Theosophist, also taught that those who were good in their previous earthly incarnation went to a place called Summerland between incarnations.

Theosophy
In Theosophy, the term "Summerland" is used without the definite article "the". Summerland, also called the Astral plane Heaven, is depicted as where souls who have been good in their previous lives go between incarnations. 

Theosophists believe the Summerlands are maintained by hosts of planetary angels serving Sanat Kumara, the Nordic alien from Venus who Theosophists believe is the governing deity of Earth and leader of the Spiritual Hierarchy of Earth. Sanat Kumara is believed to rule over our planet from the floating city of Shamballa, believed by Theosophists to exist on the etheric plane (a plane between the physical plane and the astral plane), about five miles (8 km) above the Gobi Desert.

Theosophists also believe there is another higher level of heaven called Devachan, also called the Mental plane Heaven, which some but not all souls reach between incarnations — only those souls that are more highly developed spiritually reach this level, i.e., those souls that are at the first, second, and third levels of initiation.

The final permanent eternal afterlife heaven to which Theosophists believe most people will go millions or billions of years in the future, after our cycle of reincarnations in this Round is over, is called Nirvana, and is located beyond this physical Cosmos. In order to attain Nirvana, it is necessary to have attained the fourth level of initiation or higher, meaning one is an arhat and thus no longer needs to reincarnate.

See also
 Aaru
 Bardo
 Happy hunting ground
 Otherworld

References

Afterlife places
Conceptions of heaven
Theosophical philosophical concepts
Wicca
Wiccan terminology